Armenian Music Awards was an annual music awards ceremony first held at the Alex Theatre in Glendale, California on October 7, 1998. It was created and produced for the first eight years by Peter Bahlawanian who wanted to support Armenian artists and make Armenian culture. 

The awards consist of several categories of varying 20 to 30 from year to year. Numerous artists perform live throughout the evening. 

The nominees and winners are decided by a panel of judges who listen to CDs or MP3s online compilations prior to the night of events. There are, however, some categories that are voted by the general public. Votes are cast through online voting locations. Also SMS voting has been introduced in 2007. The categories that are voted by public are Best Song of The Year, Best Duet Song of The Year, and Best Male & Female Artist of The Year. 

The tenth annual Armenian Music Awards was at the Nokia Theatre L.A. Live on December 13, 2009.

October 2018 marks the 20 year anniversary of the AMAs and to celebrate the event, there will be TV reunions of various participants throughout the years.

Notable award winners
Charles Aznavour
System of a Down
The Beautified Project
Djivan Gasparyan
Cher
Eileen Khatchadourian
Nune
Andy
Ara Gevorgyan
Gor Mkhitarian
Alla Levonyan
Harout Pamboukjian
André
Anush Hovnanyan
Hayko
Sirusho
Jacob Armen
Adiss Harmandian
Michael Brook
Gary Kesayan
Vaco
Khatchatour Avedissian
Rouben Hakhverdian
Georgi Minassian
Elon Sarafyan
Micheal Ganian
Sako
Datevik
Aram Asatryan
Dickran Mansourian
Loris Tjeknavorian
Tata Simonian
Razmik Mansourian
Armen Anassian
Nor Dar
Garo Sarafian
George Baghdoyan
Shoushan Petrosyan

References

External links
Official webpage
Official YouTube page

Armenian-American culture in California
Armenian music
Music Awards
American music awards